The black bearded saki (Chiropotes satanas) is a species of New World monkey, native to the Amazon rainforest of South America, specifically to an area of north-eastern Brazil. It is one of five species of bearded saki. Bearded sakis are medium-sized (50 cm), mostly frugivorous primates, specialised in seed predation. The genus name Chiropotes means "hand-drinker" as they have been observed using their hands as ladles for scooping water into their mouths. This behavior is thought to be a way of maintaining and protecting their characteristic beards. The black bearded sakis habitat has undergone heavy habitat fragmentation, making the future conservation status of the species uncertain.

Distribution and habitat
Black bearded sakis are endemic to the far eastern Amazon in Brazil, in a range restricted to a relatively small region from the Tocantins River in Pará east to around the Grajaú River in Maranhão (similar to the range of the equally threatened Kaapori capuchin). The natural home range of bearded sakis can vary from 200 to 250 hectares. It is the only Amazonian pitheciid found east of the Tocantins River. Studies show that bearded sakis can adapt to a reduction in their habitat.

Anatomy and morphology
Black bearded sakis can be identified by their thick black hair, distinctive beard that shapes the face, and a bushy fox-like tail. The tail is non-prehensible and they use quadrupedal movement for locomotion. Black bearded sakis have some yellowish-brown highlights around the back and shoulders and can weight from 2 kg to 4 kg. Males are slightly larger than females and also have a bulging forehead. Formerly the red-backed, brown-backed and Uta Hick's bearded sakis, the other member of the genus Chiropotes, were classified as subspecies or taxonomically insignificant variations of the same species called the bearded saki, but based on pelage differences and molecular analysis it has been recommended to treat them as separate species. The black bearded saki is the only dark-nosed species of bearded saki with a blackish back, though some females and juveniles have a paler, brownish back. The teeth have evolved for seed predation: these dental adaptations allow then to crack and access seeds in extremely hard pods. They open hard-shelled fruits in a specialized, efficient process using their teeth.

Behavior

Diet 

Black bearded sakis are highly frugivorous, specialized in seed predation as 90% of their diet comes from fruits and seeds. Black bearded sakis feed mostly on plants of the families Sapotaceae, Lecythidaceae, and Chrysobalanaceae, but they are known to feed on more than 100 species and are able to adapt their diets. They complement their diets with fleshy fruits and small insects. Black bearded sakis use their strong canine teeth to crack open hard shells of fruits and nuts, enabling them to access the unripe seeds inside the fruits.

Social behavior 
They are social animals, commonly grooming and playing with one another, even with those of other primate species. Black bearded sakis can be found in troops of 20 to 30 individuals. Individuals of a troop will separate and rejoin throughout the day, have large home ranges, and travel long distances daily.

Movement 

Black bearded sakis spend most of their time resting, traveling and eating. Black bearded sakis use mostly quadrupedal movement to move in the canopy of trees. As infants the monkeys can be seen using their tail to grasp things, but lose the ability as they mature.

Reproduction 
Bearded sakis have a gestation period of 5 months and produce one young at a time. They become sexually mature at 4 years old and have an expected lifespan of 18 years. Black bearded sakis give birth to offspring every 2 years.

Conservation 

Black bearded sakis are a critically endangered species. Just over the last few decades urbanization in the Brazilian Amazon has brought with it highways, agriculture, and dams, creating an influx of habitat fragmentation, habitat destruction and poaching pressure. Habitat fragmentation is rising as secondary roads increase and people move into uninhabited areas of the Amazon rainforest. Along with an influx of people the amount of agriculture required to support the area increases, augmenting the pressure for deforestation.

Behavioral modifications due to forest fragmentation 
Studies reveal that black bearded sakis can adapt to habitat up to 3% the size of their original range. However, it is unclear whether this behavioral flexibility is sufficient for the long-term viability of this species in fragmented habitats. Forest fragmentation has resulted in behavioral changes that allow the species to adapt but could be detrimental for its conservation status in the long run. Black bearded saki groups will not leave isolated patches of fragmented forest unless the bridge of secondary forest grows. Groups in smaller patches of forest will tend to move and vocalize less while resting more. Population density will increase as habitat size decreases, causing a positive tendency in disease among the black bearded saki population living in small patches. This species also face a hunting problem for bushmeat and their tails used as dusters.

Bearded sakis living in small forest fragments are limited in their dietary choices because of the reduced number of plant species present, and therefore consume species that those individuals inhabiting continuous forests would ignore. Shifts in feeding patterns occur where fragmentation has been accompanied by selective logging of species used by black bearded sakis as food. The ability to have a flexible diet and include seeds and unripe fruit helps this species survive in smaller forest fragments, but it appears that these conditions are unviable unless connectivity increases among the forest fragments and continuous forest in the landscape. The future survival of the black bearded saki will depend on adequate meta-population and habitat management. Habitat conservation is of top priority as this species has a particularly small range. The black bearded saki is considered the most endangered primate in the Amazon and is already locally extinct in a large portion of its original range.

Future survival 
Studies performed at the Biological Dynamics of Forest Fragments Project study area have recorded the changes in behavior caused in black bearded sakis by habitat fragmentation. Groups of black bearded saki living in 10 hectare fragments of isolated rainforest showed a lack of reproduction in a period of 3.5 years. This might be due to a lack of resources in these small isolated fragments of habitat. Smaller fragments of forest also result in higher population densities. The increased density of bearded saki monkeys in the small fragments may affect their health. Higher density groups living in forest fragments are more prone to parasites and disease than those others living in undisturbed areas. It is unknown if the species will be able to reproduce and achieve healthy populations in the smaller patches of fragmented forest they are forced to inhabit.

References

External links 
 ARKive - Images and videos of Chiropotes satanas

Sakis and uakaris
Endemic fauna of Brazil
Mammals of Brazil
Mammals described in 1807
Taxa named by Johann Centurius Hoffmannsegg